Rankinian is an extinct genus of prehistoric bony fish that lived from the Santonian to the Campanian.

See also

 Prehistoric fish
 List of prehistoric bony fish

References

Late Cretaceous fish